Iliac lymph nodes may refer to:

External iliac lymph nodes
Internal iliac lymph nodes